Mireille Oudit (born 10 October 1945) is a French politician. She represented the department of Marne in the French Senate from 3 November 2010 to 30 September 2011 as a Union for a Popular Movement member.

She operates a farm. She was mayor of Val-de-Vière from 1995 to 2008.

She did not run for reelection in 2011.

She married François Oudit in 1964; the couple had seven children. He died in 2016.

References 

People from Vitry-le-François
1945 births
Living people
French Senators of the Fifth Republic
Union for a Popular Movement politicians
Women mayors of places in France
20th-century French women politicians
21st-century French women politicians
Women members of the Senate (France)
Senators of Marne (department)